Saswat Joshi (born December 18, 1984) is an Indian classical dancer, choreographer, model, known for his use of the Odissi dancing style.

Early life and background
Saswat Joshi was born in Titlagarh on 18 December 1984. Saswat started studying dancing at the age of five guided by gurus Prasanta Patnaik and Shantanu Behera at his native village of Titlagarh, Bolangir.

Career

As an Odissi dancer
Saswat started his professional Odissi training under Guru Padma Shri Kumkum Mohanty in 2000. He has been an exponent of Padma Vibhusan recipient Guru Kelucharan Mohapatra's Odissi style, and trained under the guidance of Guru Ileana Citaristi. He has received a national scholarship from the Indian Ministry of Culture, which he used to pursue a Visharad at Chandigarh University. He was also awarded a Sangeet Ratna from Rabindra Bharati University. He performed at Musée Guimet in Paris, France in 2012, as well as giving lecture demonstrations of Odissi in various universities.

To popularise the Odissi form of Indian classical dance, he has traveled and performed in many European and Asian countries such as Italy, France, Hungary, Finland, Japan, South Korea, and Thailand.

He shared the stage with many internationally known dancers, such as Carla Fracci, Luciana Savignano, Giuseppe Picone, Beppe Menegatti, Rossella Brescia and Luciano Mattia Cannito in a production called 'I Have a Dream' at Palermo city, Sicily of Insular Italy

Filmography
Koun Kitney Panee Mein by Nila Madhab Panda
Kranti Dhara by Himanshu Khatua
Choreography consultancy in various Bollywood films

As a dance teacher
Saswat is the founder of Lasyakala Institute of Performing Arts. The institute also organizes the annual Aekalavya Dance Festival.

References

External links

"Happy for Hope virtual event during COVID-19 lock down"
Ghungroo Missing? short film released by Saswat Joshi
Chakaa Aakhii Short Film by Saswat Joshi, streaming now 

1984 births
Living people
Indian dance teachers
Odissi exponents
Indian film choreographers
Indian classical choreographers
Dancers from Odisha